The Arnold Potter House (also known as Potter Mansion) is a historic house located at 1445 Voak Road in Potter, Yates County, New York.

Description and history 
It is a massive five-by-five-bay, two-story home built in about 1790 in the Georgian style. It was built by Robert Jordon and also Nathan Warner, an early settler of Nettle Valley & (---) Clark.

It was listed on the National Register of Historic Places on August 24, 1994.

References

Houses completed in 1790
Houses on the National Register of Historic Places in New York (state)
Georgian architecture in New York (state)
Houses in Yates County, New York
National Register of Historic Places in Yates County, New York